"Let's Love" is a song by English singer Melanie C from her second studio album, Reason. It was released as a single exclusively in Japan on 6 August 2003, after "Let's Love" was licensed to a Toyota TV commercial that ran for six months throughout 2003.

Performances
Although there was no music video to accompany the single's release, Melanie C did perform the song live as part of her Reason Tour. She also included the song in the set-lists of The Barfly Mini-Tour (2004) and This Time Canadian Tour (2008).

Format and track listing
This is the format and track listing of the major single release of "Let's Love".

Japanese CD single
"Let's Love" – 3:23
"Like That" – 3:09
"Living Without You" – 4:06
"Let's Love"  – 3:23

Release history

References

2003 singles
Melanie C songs
Songs written by Phil Thornalley
Songs written by Melanie C